Lutterworth College is a large 11–19 non-selective, inclusive, comprehensive, Church of England Secondary School and Sixth Form College with academy status.

Lutterworth College is situated in the rural market town of Lutterworth in the district of Harborough, South Leicestershire. The school is a Church of England Voluntary Controlled school.

There are approximately 1,600 pupils currently on roll, with around 400 of these being in post-16 education.

The last full Ofsted inspection was in November 2017 where the college was judged to be good in all aspects.  In 2019 the school was inspected under the SIAMS framework and was judged good in all aspects. Part of the moral purpose of the college is ‘enabling all students to learn, flourish and succeed.’

History 
There has been a school in Lutterworth at least since 1613 though the first part of Lutterworth College, then named Lutterworth Grammar School was built in 1880 to provide a middle class boys school for approximately 50 boarders and day scholars. The school remained an all boys grammar until 1902 when the school began to admit female pupils.

The school has grown in size from 30 pupils in 1881 to over 2000 in 2010. In 2014 numbers began to fall alongside the college's main neighbouring feeder schools, Lutterworth High School, Brockington College and Thomas Estley Community College expanding their age ranges from 11-14 to 11-16, much like the rest of Leicestershire.

In 2006, it was agreed to change the school’s name from Lutterworth Grammar School to Lutterworth College, to reflect the fact that the college "is not a selective institution, but rather an inclusive one". In September 2015 the college admitted its first cohort of Year 7 pupils.

In 2017, Lutterworth College became the highest attaining school in Leicestershire.

In November 2017, OFSTED judged the school to be a Good school in all aspects.

Notable former pupils
 Kid Acne, artist and musician
 John Ashton (guitarist), musician
 Stephen Biesty, author
 Michael Casey, Professor of Music at Dartmouth College
 John Cooper (hurdler), Olympic Athlete
 Nick Cook, cricketer
 Jonathan Emmett, author
 Jamie Green, (racing driver)
 Jonnie Irwin, television presenter
 Kristyna Myles, musician
 Anthony Thistlethwaite, musician
 Alex Thomas, musician
 Simon Yates, mountaineer

References

External links
 BBC article

Secondary schools in Leicestershire
Church of England secondary schools in the Diocese of Leicester
Academies in Leicestershire
Lutterworth